This is a list of members of the sixth Eastern Cape Provincial Legislature as elected in the election of 8 May 2019 and taking into account changes in membership since the election. Pursuant to the 2019 election, the African National Congress (ANC) retained its comfortable majority in the legislature, winning 44 of 63 seats. During the legislature's first sitting on 22 May 2019, Oscar Mabuyane of the ANC was elected as Premier of the Eastern Cape. 

The Democratic Alliance (DA), with 10 seats, retained its status as the official opposition in the legislature. Also represented are the Economic Freedom Fighters, with five seats; the United Democratic Movement (UDM), with two seats; and the African Transformation Movement (ATM) and Freedom Front Plus (FF+) with one seat apiece. The Congress of the People and the African Independent Congress both lost their representation in the legislature, failing to win any seats in the 2019 election.

Composition 
This is a graphical comparison of party strengths as they stand in the sixth Eastern Cape Provincial Legislature.

Note this is not the official seating plan of the Eastern Cape Provincial Legislature.

|-style="background:#e9e9e9;"
!colspan="2" style="text-align:left"| Party !! style="text-align:center"| Seats 
|-
|  || 44
|-
|  || 10
|-
|  || 5
|-
|  || 2 
|-
|  || 1
|-
|  || 1 
|-
|colspan="2" style="text-align:left"| Total || style="text-align:right"| 63
|}

Members

Former members 
There were several mid-term changes to the composition of the ANC caucus. Nomvula Ponco, ranked 45th on the ANC's party list, was sworn in shortly after the election in June 2019, after initially failing to gain a seat. In August 2019, Kesava Pillai Anilkumar filled the vacancy created by the death of Ncediwe Nobevu-Booi in July, and in August 2022, Zolile Williams was sworn in to replace Babalo Madikizela, who resigned.

On the opposition benches, Democratic Alliance provincial leader Nqaba Bhanga resigned from the legislature in March 2020 to serve as Mayor of Nelson Mandela Bay; his seat was filled by Kobus Botha. Bhanga returned to the legislature in December 2021. In August 2022, Retief Odendaal resigned, also to serve as Mayor of Nelson Mandela Bay. The Freedom Front's sole representative in the legislature, Theo Coetzee, died in January 2023 and was replaced by Jaco Burger the following month. Also in February 2023, Simthembile Madikizela and Zilindile Vena were sworn in to the legislature to represent the Economic Freedom Fighters, filling vacancies occasioned by the resignations of Mlamli Makhetha and Yazini Tetyana.

References

Legislature